Prokop Sieniawski may refer to:

Prokop Sieniawski (d. 1596), a Polish noble
Prokop Sieniawski (d. 1627) (died 1626 or 1627), a Polish noble, Royal Rotmistrz from 1621 onward and Court Chorąży of the Crown after 1622